The Method of Factors is a technique in cognitive behavioral therapy to organise a session of exposure therapy. Rather than  generating a list of objects or situations in advance ( a static hierarchy) representing escalating levels of arousal and intensity of fear for a particular phobia, the Method of Factors involves identifying a fear-provoking stimulus, then identifying those features of the stimulus that control the intensity of fear. The hierarchy then emerges in the course of the exposure session as the patient seeks to maintain a moderately high arousal. Because of this emergent nature, it is referred to as a Dynamic Hierarchy

Further reading
Brady A, Raines D (2010) Dynamic hierarchies: a control system paradigm for exposure therapy.  The Cognitive Behaviour Therapist, 2, 51-62

External links
Diploma In Cognitive Behavioural Therapy

Cognitive behavioral therapy